The following is a chronology of the history of the city of Granada, Andalusia, Spain.

Before 16th century

 64 CE - Diocese of Granada established (approximate date).
 8th century - City wall construction begins.
 713 CE - Muslims in power.
 1066 - Massacred the Jewish population of the city 1066 Granada massacre
 1090 - Almoravids in power.
 1166 - Almohads in power.
 1238 - City becomes capital of the Nasrid Emirate of Granada, Al-Andalus; Muhammad ibn Nasr in power.
 1248 - Alhambra construction begins.
 1309 - Generalife built.
 1319 - Alcázar Genil built.
 1330s - Corral del Carbón built.
 1349 - Yusufiyya Madrasa established.
 1367 - Maristan (hospital) built.
 1370 - Alhambra's Palace of the Myrtles built.
 1391 - Alhambra's Palace of the Lions built.
 1410s - Antequeruela settlement developed.
 1492
 City becomes capital of the Kingdom of Granada (Crown of Castile).
 Edict of Expulsion of Jews issued.
 1493 - Hernando de Talavera becomes archbishop.
 1496 - Printing press in use.
 1499 - Muslim rebellions in Granada province.

16th-19th centuries

 1501 - City divided into 23 parishes.
 1504 -  founded.
 1505 -  established.
 1516 - Carthusian monastery built outside city.
 1521 - Capilla Real built.
 1525 - Burial of monarchs Ferdinand and Isabella in the Capilla Real.
 1531 - University of Granada founded.
 1587 - Chancillería (tribunal building) constructed.
 1593 - Theatre built.
 1614 - Expulsion of the Moriscos.
 1624 - April: Philip IV visits city.
 1703 - Granada Cathedral built.
 1764 - Gacetilla Curiosa begins publication.
 1810 - Occupation of city by French forces begins.
 1812 - Occupation of city by French forces ends.
 1833 - Province of Granada established.
 1839 - Museo de Bellas Artes de Granada established.
 1843 - Alcaiceria (bazaar) burns down.
 1879 - Provincial Archaeological Museum of Granada established.
 1892 - Caja General de Ahorros de Granada (bank) founded.
 1900 - Population: 75,900.

20th century

 1910 - Cafe Futbol in business.
 1920 - Population: 103,368.
 1929 - Casa de los Tiros Museum established.
 1931 - Granada Club de Fútbol formed.
 1936
 March: Post-election unrest.
 19 August: Death of poet Lorca in Alfacar.
 1940 - Population: 155,405.
 1961 - Cine Madrigal (cinema) opens.
 1972 - Airport opens.
 1981 - Population: 262,182.
 1984 - Alhambra declared a UNESCO World Heritage Site.
 1986 - Huerta de San Vicente Museum (of Lorca) active (approximate date).
 1991
  becomes mayor.
 Population: 287,864.
 1995
 Parque de las Ciencias (science museum) and Estadio Nuevo Los Cármenes (stadium) open.
 Gabriel Díaz Berbel becomes mayor.
 1999 -  becomes mayor.

21st century

 2003
 Mosque built.
 José Torres Hurtado becomes mayor.
 2004
 Granada Atlético Club de Fútbol formed.
 Kinepolis Granada (cinema) opens near city.
 2007 - Granada metro construction begins.
 2008 - Hay Festival of literature held.
 2014 -  established.

See also
 Granada history
 Timeline of the Muslim presence in the Iberian Peninsula, circa 8th-15th century CE
 Timelines of other cities in the autonomous community of Andalusia: Almería, Cádiz, Córdoba, Jaén, Jerez de la Frontera, Málaga, Seville
 List of municipalities in Andalusia

References

This article incorporates information from the Spanish Wikipedia.

Bibliography
Published in the 19th century
 
 
 
 
 
 
  1905 ed.

Published in the 20th century
 
 
 
 
 
 
 
 
 J Dickie. Granada: A case study of Arab urbanism in Muslim Spain. 1992.
 
Published in the 21st century
  (discusses Ganivet's writing about Granada)
 Teodoro Luque-Martínez and Francisco Muñoz-Leiva. "City benchmarking: a methodological proposal referring specifically to Granada." Cities 22.6 (2005): 411–423.
 
 D Coleman. Creating Christian Granada: Society and Religious Culture in an Old-World Frontier City, 1492–1600. 2013

External links

 Map of Granada, 1943
 Europeana. Items related to Granada, various dates.
 Digital Public Library of America. Items related to Granada, various dates

Granada